L. Paul Kehoe (born May 21, 1938) is an American lawyer and politician from New York.

Life
He was born on May 21, 1938, in Carthage, Jefferson County, New York. He attended Copenhagen Central School. He graduated from Syracuse University in 1959, and J.D. from Syracuse University College of Law in 1962. Then he served in the U.S. Army, and began the practice of law in 1963 in Watertown. In 1966, he moved to Wolcott. He married Betty, and they had three children.

He entered politics as a Republican, and was District Attorney of Wayne County from 1967 to 1971.

He was a member of the New York State Assembly in 1979 and 1980;and a member of the New York State Senate from 1981 to 1992, sitting in the 184th, 185th, 186th, 187th, 188th and 189th New York State Legislatures.

He was a justice of the New York Supreme Court (7th D.) from 1993 to 2006. He was the Administrative Judge of the 7th District from 1996 to 2000, and was designated to the Appellate Division in 2000.

He practices law as a Senior Counsel with the law firm of Harris, Chesworth, O'Brien, Johnstone & Welch, LLP.

References

1938 births
Living people
People from Carthage, New York
Republican Party New York (state) state senators
Syracuse University College of Law alumni
People from Wayne County, New York
Republican Party members of the New York State Assembly
New York Supreme Court Justices
Wayne County District Attorneys